Corbin Independent School District or Corbin Schools is a school district headquartered in Corbin, Kentucky.

Schools
Secondary schools:
 Corbin High School (grades 9–12)
 Corbin Middle School (grades 6–8)
Primary schools:
 Corbin Elementary School (grades 4–5)
 Corbin Primary School (grades K-3)
Preschools:
 Corbin Preschool Center (preschool)

Alternative schools:
 Corbin Area Technology Center (grades 9–12)
 Corbin Educational Center (grades 5–12)
 School of Innovation (grades K-12)

See also 
 WRHR-LP: educational radio station owned by the district

References

External links
 
School districts in Kentucky
Education in Whitley County, Kentucky
Education in Knox County, Kentucky